No Time to Chill is the fifth studio album by German band Scooter. It was released on 20 July 1998. It contains three singles, "How Much Is the Fish?", "We Are The Greatest/I Was Made For Lovin' You" and "Call Me Mañana". It is the first album featuring Axel Coon.

Track listing
All songs written and composed by H.P. Baxxter, Rick J. Jordan, Axel Coon, and Jens Thele; except "I Was Made for Lovin' You" written by Paul Stanley, Desmond Child, and Vini Poncia; "Eyes Without a Face" written by Billy Idol and Steve Stevens.
All lyrics written by The Radical MC H.P.

"Last Warning" – 0:56
"How Much Is the Fish?" – 3:45
"We Are the Greatest" – 5:08
"Call Me Mañana" – 3:54
"Don't Stop" – 3:39
"I Was Made for Lovin' You" – 3:32
"Frequent Traveller" – 3:35
"Eyes Without a Face" – 3:17
"Hands Up!" – 4:05
"Everything's Borrowed" – 5:13
"Expecting More from Ratty" – 4:10
"Time and Space" – 4:49
Notes
"How Much Is the Fish?" samples the song "Zeven Dagen Lang" by the Dutch band Bots. The melody originates from a traditional Celtic Son ar Chistr played on Alan Stivell's 1970 album Reflets. The title is derived from lyrics in the song "Buffalo" by Anglo-Irish indie group Stump, taken from the 1986 mini-album Quirk Out. The background music sample comes from the album version of the song Paradox from the German band 666.
"We Are The Greatest" samples the 1982 single "Street Dance" by rap act Break Machine and the lyrics of the 1985 song "Don't Stop The Rock" by Freestyle.
Single version of "Call Me Mañana" samples the song "James Brown Is Dead" by Dutch rave duo L.A. Style, as well as Scooter's own song "I'm Raving".
"I Was Made For Lovin' You" is a cover of the KISS song, taken from the 1979 album Dynasty.
"Eyes Without A Face" is a cover of the Billy Idol song, taken from the 1983 album Rebel Yell.
"Expecting More From Ratty" was the first mention of the group's future pseudonym 'Ratty', under which name they would release two singles and produce several remixes.

Charts

Year-end charts

Certifications

References

1998 albums
Edel AG albums
Scooter (band) albums